Mount Moriah is a neighborhood in Southwest Philadelphia, east of Cobbs Creek in the vicinity of Kingsessing Avenue.

The neighborhood shares its name with the Mount Moriah Cemetery which was founded next to Cobbs Creek in 1855.

The Joseph W. Catharine School was added to the National Register of Historic Places in 1988. 
The 19142 zip code is included in this area.

References

Neighborhoods in Philadelphia
Southwest Philadelphia